Zouma is the name three French footballers:

Kurt Zouma (born 1994), plays for West Ham and France 
Lionel Zouma (born 1993), plays for Vevey United and the Central African Republic 
Yoan Zouma (born 1998), plays for Dagenham and Redbridge 

It is also the name of towns and villages in China:

Zouma, Hefeng County (走马镇), in Hefeng County, Enshi Tujia and Miao Autonomous Prefecture, Hubei
Zouma, a village in Shawo Township, Echeng District, Ezhou, Hubei
Zouma, a village in Meichuan, Wuxue, Huanggang, Hubei